"Hamsterdam" (called "Amsterdam" in some releases) is the fourth episode of the third season of the HBO original series The Wire. The episode was written by George Pelecanos from a story by David Simon & George Pelecanos and was directed by Ernest Dickerson. It originally aired on October 10, 2004.

Plot
While having dinner with white friends, Carcetti expresses disapproval when they make disparaging comments about African Americans and tells them he intends to run for mayor. He approaches Theresa D'Agostino, a political consultant he knows from law school, and courts her interest in becoming his campaign manager. D'Agostino dismisses his chances since he would be a white candidate running in a majority-black city. Elsewhere, Bunk is unable to find Dozerman's missing gun. He asks McNulty to locate Omar to help with the murders of Tank and Tosha. Later, a drunk McNulty visits Pearlman's house and demands to come inside, when he notices Daniels' car out front. Daniels and Pearlman see McNulty through the window.

In the Western, Colvin attends a town hall meeting where residents vent their frustrations on rampant crime and the perceived lack of policing. Colvin admits everything they have done has failed; while the residents seem to appreciate his candor, they are enraged that he has put forth no tangible solutions. Later, Colvin looks into working security at Johns Hopkins University following his retirement. When Carver's squad fails to corral the Western's drug crews into Colvin's free zones, Colvin orders school buses to round up the dealers. They are gathered in a school gym and are unwilling to listen to Colvin as he tries to explain how the free zones will operate. Elsewhere, Cutty learns that his landscaping crew is entirely composed of ex-convicts. He approaches Slim Charles, offering himself for anything that pays.

McNulty observes a meeting between Bell, developer Andy Krawczyk and State Senator Clay Davis, who discuss plans for revamping Bell's properties as residences in gentrifying areas. Donette tells Bell about McNulty's visit, but Bell convinces her that D'Angelo's death couldn't be a murder because no one would have risked killing him in the same prison as Avon. Meanwhile, Avon is granted parole despite Pearlman's protests, and Cutty, Slim Charles, Gerard, and Sapper survey one of their dealers who has been short on his count. Later, Bodie hosts a party where he plies Cutty with drugs and women. At the behest of McNulty and Greggs, Bubbles explores the Barksdale territory in the Western and sees Marlo talking to Fruit, memorizing his license plate number.

Back at the detail, Freamon admonishes McNulty and Greggs for showing disloyalty towards Daniels by investigating Bell, despite what the lieutenant has done for them. Freamon and McNulty almost come to blows. Bubbles reports to the detectives about how Marlo has stayed out of the collaboration between the Barksdales and the East Side dealers. Using the license plate number, they pull up Marlo's criminal record. Greggs visits Homicide to talk to Detective Vernon Holley, who describes Marlo as pure evil. She theorizes that Marlo is working for Bell. Greggs spends a day with Bubbles mapping out the territories of the dealers, learning that they are using disposable cell phones.

McNulty visits Bell's community college and, using the school's phone records, traces a cell number to Bell. Freamon has Prez check property purchasing records for Bell's front organization. From this information, the detail learns that Bell is trying to build a "legitimate" business as a property developer, either parallel to or instead of his illicit drug operation. McNulty worries about how they can wiretap Bell's disposable phones. Freamon tells McNulty to swallow his pride and return to the Major Case Unit. Daniels has an awkward drink with McNulty as they discuss Daniels' new relationship with Pearlman. McNulty tells him that he wishes them all the best and Daniels thanks him for making it "easy."

Production

Title reference

The title refers to the Dutch city of Amsterdam, which is famous for its liberal drug laws; Officers Thomas "Herc" Hauk and Anthony Colicchio use the city's name as an example to the drug dealers. This subplot was introduced to explore the potential positive effects of de facto "legalization" of the illegal drug trade, and incidentally prostitution, within the limited boundaries of a few uninhabited city blocks. The posited benefits were reduced street crime citywide and increased outreach of health and social services to at-risk populations. The name "Hamsterdam" comes from the drug dealers' mishearing Herc when he refers to Amsterdam, although some viewers have noted that the "Ham" reference may also be a pun based on the dealers' view of the police as "pigs" as well as a possible reference to hamster wheels and the seemingly continuous cycle of crime, drugs, and politics as being routine.

Epigraph

Fruit makes this statement in response to Carver and his team trying to move his crew into one of the new drug tolerant zones. This also ties in with Carcetti's announcement of running for mayor in Baltimore, despite his ethnicity, as well as Cutty's difficulty at changing his ways. To a lesser extent, it can apply to McNulty and Rhonda's dysfunctional relationship.

Reception
Darkroom Productions' "Hamsterdam" mixtape series, a collection of work from Baltimore rap artists, takes its name from this episode.

The second soundtrack compilation Beyond Hamsterdam takes its name from this episode.

The term "Hamsterdam" (or sometimes "Hampsterdam") has since been used to characterize districts or regions that are ignored by law enforcement agencies.

The episode "The Foot of Canal Street" in the first season of the HBO series Treme contains an inside joke, when Sonny's friends refer to his hometown as "Hamsterdam" rather than "Amsterdam". George Pelecanos wrote this "Treme" episode, and many of the Hamsterdam episodes of The Wire.

Credits

Starring cast
Although credited, John Doman and Michael K. Williams do not appear in this episode.

Guest stars
Callie Thorne as Elena McNulty
Isiah Whitlock, Jr. as Senator Clayton "Clay" Davis
Tray Chaney as Malik "Poot" Carr
Chad L. Coleman as Dennis "Cutty" Wise
Benjamin Busch as Officer Anthony Colicchio
Jay Landsman as Lieutenant Dennis Mello
Delaney Williams as Sergeant Jay Landsman
Richard Burton as Sean "Shamrock" McGinty
Brandon Fobbs as Fruit
Anwan Glover as Slim Charles
Mayo Best as Gerard
R. Emery Bright as Community Relations Sergeant
Clarence Clemons as Roman (credited as Clarence Clemens)
Brandan T. Tate as Sapper
Maria Broom as Marla Daniels
Shamyl Brown as Donette
Brandy Burre as Theresa D'Agostino
Vera Holley as School principal
Muna Otaru as college records clerk
Tony Cordova as Sean McNulty
Michael Kostroff as Maurice Levy
Eugene Little as Landscaping boss
Michael Willis as Andy Krawczyk
Brian Anthony Wilson as Detective Vernon Holley
Clarence Clemons' name is misspelled as Clarence Clemens in the credits.

Uncredited appearances
Joilet F. Harris as Officer Caroline Massey
Ryan Sands as Officer Lloyd "Truck" Garrick
De'Rodd Hearns as Puddin
Justin Burley as Justin
Melvin T. Russell as Jamal
Edward Green as Spider
Rico Sterling as Tyrell
Marc Krinsky as Angelo Martin
Kay Lawal as concerned resident
Unknown as William Gant's cousin
Unknown as Pete Sinopoli

First appearances
Spider: a young corner boy who is brought into Colvin's pep talk.
Theresa D'Agostino: campaign manager for Carcetti

References

External links
"Hamsterdam"  at HBO.com

The Wire (season 3) episodes
2004 American television episodes
Television episodes directed by Ernest Dickerson